Tural Jalilov (born 28 November 1986) is an Azerbaijani professional footballer, who plays for Kapaz PFK.

Career
Jalilov left Zira FK on 2 May 2017. On 11 May 2017, Jalilov signed a one-year contract with Kapaz PFK.

Career statistics

Club

International

Statistics accurate as of match played 15 November 2009

Honours

Player
 Khazar Lankaran
 Azerbaijan Supercup (1) – 2013

References

External links
 

1986 births
Living people
Azerbaijani footballers
Azerbaijan international footballers
Simurq PIK players
Khazar Lankaran FK players
Ravan Baku FC players
Zira FK players
Kapaz PFK players
Azerbaijan Premier League players
People from Khachmaz
Association football midfielders
FK Genclerbirliyi Sumqayit players